Volunteer Slam was a professional wrestling supercard event produced by the American professional wrestling promotion Smoky Mountain Wrestling (SMW). Volunteer Slam was the first major supercard produced by SMW on May 20, 1992, which featured a tournament to crown the inaugural SMW Heavyweight Champion. A premier event of SMW, the event was held at the Knoxville Civic Coliseum in Knoxville, Tennessee in May every year from 1992 to 1995.

Dates, venues and main events

References

External links
SMW Results at Pro Wrestling History
SMW Results at The History of WWE

Recurring events established in 1992
Recurring events disestablished in 1995
Volunteer Slam